All About Comin' Up is an album by Gangsta Pat.

Track listing 
 "All About Comin' Up" - 3:12
 "Stay Away from Cali" - 4:31
 "I'm Still the Gangsta" - 4:41
 "Gangsta Groove" - 4:11
 "Spend the Night" - 4:39
 "My Neighborhood" - 3:47
 "Gangsta Boogie" - 4:18
 "Watookmesolong" - 4:49
 "Fatal Attraction" - 4:06
 "Gangstas Need Love, Too" - 6:24
 "My Name Ain't Rover" - 3:30
 "Dedication" - 2:00

References 

1992 albums
Gangsta Pat albums